Orion Pictures (legal name Orion Releasing, LLC) is an American film production and distribution company owned by Amazon through its Metro-Goldwyn-Mayer (MGM) subsidiary. In its original operating period, the company produced and released films from 1978 until 1999 and was also involved in television production and syndication throughout the 1980s until the early 1990s. It was formed in 1978 as a joint venture between Warner Bros. and three former senior executives at United Artists. From its founding until its buyout by MGM in the late 1990s, Orion was considered one of the largest mini-major studios.

Woody Allen, James Cameron, Jonathan Demme, Oliver Stone, and several other prominent directors worked with Orion during its most successful years from 1978 to 1992. Of the films distributed by Orion, four won Academy Awards for Best Picture: Amadeus (1984), Platoon (1986), Dances with Wolves (1990), and The Silence of the Lambs (1991).  Three other Orion films, Hannah and Her Sisters (1986), Mississippi Burning (1988), and Women Talking (2022) were nominated for that same category.

Since 1997, Orion has been owned by Metro-Goldwyn-Mayer (MGM). In 2013, MGM revived the Orion name for television; a year later, Orion Pictures was relaunched by the studio.

History

1978–1981: Beginnings
In January 1978, three executives of Transamerica (TA)-owned studio United Artists (UA)—Arthur B. Krim (chairman), Eric Pleskow (president and chief executive officer), and Robert S. Benjamin (chairman of the finance committee)—quit their jobs. Krim and Benjamin had headed UA since 1951 and subsequently turned around the then-flailing studio with a number of critical and commercial successes. Change had begun once Transamerica purchased UA in 1967 and, within a decade, a rift formed between Krim and Transamerica chairman John R. Beckett concerning the studio's operations. Krim suggested spinning off United Artists into a separate company which was rejected by Beckett.

The last straw came for Pleskow when he refused to collect and deliver the medical records of UA department heads to Transamerica's offices in San Francisco for the sake of confidentiality. The tensions only worsened when Fortune magazine reported an article on the clash between UA and TA in which Beckett had stated that, if the executives disliked the parent company's treatment of them, they should resign. Krim, Benjamin and Pleskow quit United Artists on January 13, 1978, followed by the exits of senior vice presidents William Bernstein and Mike Medavoy three days later. The week following the resignations, according to the website Reference for Business, 63 important Hollywood figures took out an advertisement in a trade paper warning UA that it had made a fatal mistake in letting the five men leave. The 'fatal mistake' came true following the box-office disaster of Heaven's Gate in 1980 which led to Transamerica selling UA to Metro-Goldwyn-Mayer.

In February 1978, the five men forged a deal with Warner Bros. The executives formed Orion Pictures Company, named after the constellation which they claimed had five main stars (it actually has seven or eight). The new company intended only to finance projects, giving the filmmakers complete creative autonomy; this ideal had been successfully implemented at United Artists. Orion held a $100 million line of credit and its films would be distributed by the Warner Bros. studio. Orion, however, was contractually given free rein over distribution and advertising as well as the number and type of films the executives chose to invest in.

In late March 1978, Orion signed its first contract, a two-picture deal with John Travolta's production company. Contracts with actress and director Barbra Streisand; actors James Caan, Jane Fonda, Peter Sellers, Jon Voight, and Burt Reynolds; directors Francis Ford Coppola and Blake Edwards; writer/director John Milius; singer Peter Frampton; and producer Ray Stark soon materialized. Orion also developed a co-financing and distribution deal with EMI Films. In its first year, Orion had fifteen films in production and had a dozen more actors, directors and producers lining up to sign with them.

In 1979, Benjamin died. Orion's first film, A Little Romance, was released in April that year. Later that year, Orion released Blake Edwards' 10 which became a commercial success, the first for Edwards in over a decade (aside from installments of The Pink Panther franchise). Other films released by Orion over the next two years included a few successes such as Caddyshack (1980) and Arthur (1981); critically praised but underperforming films such as The Great Santini (1979), an adaptation of a Pat Conroy novel, and Sidney Lumet's Prince of the City (1981); and pictures by young writer-directors such as Philip Kaufman's The Wanderers (1979) and Nicholas Meyer's debut Time After Time (1979); plus Monty Python's Life of Brian (1979) which Orion only distributed in the United States. Out of the 23 films Orion released between April 1979 and December 1981, only a third of them made a profit. Orion executives were conflicted over financing big-budgeted films and passed on Raiders of the Lost Ark (1981) for that reason.

1982–1986: Split from Warner Bros.
By early 1982, Orion had severed its distribution ties with Warner. As part of the deal, the rights to Orion's films made up to that point were sold to Warner. Orion was now looking to have its own distribution network by acquiring another company with such capabilities. The four partners looked into Allied Artists and Embassy Pictures before settling on Filmways. Orion subsequently purchased Filmways and reorganized the flailing company. New employees were hired and all of Filmways' non-entertainment assets (Grosset & Dunlap and Broadcast Electronics) were sold off.

Another result of the merger was that Orion entered television production. Orion's biggest TV hit was Cagney & Lacey which lasted seven seasons on CBS. In 1983, Orion Pictures introduced art-house division Orion Classics with executives who had previously run United Artists Classics.

According to Reference for Business: "Of the first 18 movies the company had released as Orion Pictures Corporation, ten had been profitable, five had broken even, and three had losses of less than $2 million." One such film, Francis Ford Coppola's The Cotton Club, was mired in legal troubles and Orion lost $3 million of its investment. "We've had some singles and doubles [but haven't] had any home runs," lamented Krim. In September 1984, Orion distributed Amadeus, which garnered many accolades, winning eight Academy Awards, including Best Picture. That year, on April 3, 1984, Orion Pictures launched Orion Entertainment Group, that would consist of four groups, Orion Television, Orion Home Video, Orion Pay Television and Orion Television Syndication, and the new organization would produce and distribute product for television, home video, pay and syndicated markets, with Jamie Kellner serving as president.

For Orion, 1985 was a dismal year. All but two films, Desperately Seeking Susan and Code of Silence, made less than $10 million in the United States box office, including an unsuccessful attempt at a James Bond–type franchise, Remo Williams: The Adventure Begins. Orion's haphazard distribution channels and unsuccessful advertising campaigns made it impossible to achieve a hit. Another factor was that Orion was about to venture into the video business and stopped selling off home use rights to its films. Furthermore, production of the Rodney Dangerfield comedy Back to School was put on hold when a co-producer died, taking the film off of its Christmas 1985 release slate.

In January 1986, Mario Kassar and Andrew Vajna, producers of the Rambo films (the first film, First Blood, was distributed by Orion) attempted to buy $55 million worth of the studio's stock through the duo's company, Anabasis. Had they succeeded, Kassar and Vajna would have controlled the board and laid off every executive save for Krim. Warburg Pincus subsequently limited its 20% stake in Orion to 5%; the remaining stock was acquired by Viacom International. Viacom hoped to use Orion's product for its pay-TV channel Showtime. Orion expanded into home video distribution with the formation of Orion Home Entertainment Corporation in 1985, which began distributing videos under the Orion Home Video label in 1987 (prior to OHV's formation, HBO Video and their predecessors, as well as Vestron Video and Embassy Home Entertainment, had been responsible for home media releases of Orion product).

1986–1991: Metromedia era
On May 22, 1986, Metromedia, a television and communications company controlled by billionaire (and a friend of Krim's) John Kluge, which had just divested of its television station group to Rupert Murdoch's News Corporation (which would form what is now the Fox network), purchased a 6.5% stake in Orion. Kluge's investment in the company came at the right time- Back to School was a success and ultimately earned $90 million at the box office. By March 1987, the studio's fortunes increased dramatically with a succession of critical and commercial hits, including Platoon (which ultimately won a Best Picture Oscar), Woody Allen's Hannah and Her Sisters, and the sports film Hoosiers. Orion's 1986 offerings totaled 18 Academy Award nominations, more than any other studio. In 1987, Orion achieved further success with RoboCop and No Way Out. By this time, Orion's television division had expanded into the lucrative syndicated game show market under the name Century Towers Productions, in reference to Orion's street address at the time. It produced revivals of format inherited from Heatter-Quigley Productions after the Filmways merger (as Filmways had previously acquired HQ in the late 1960s); this included The New Hollywood Squares, which ran from 1986 to 1989, and a revival of High Rollers which aired in the 1987–88 season. That year, former CBS/Fox Video executive Len White joined Orion Home Video, in order to become president and CEO of the home video division, in order to oversee home video technology, and Orion had excepted to release its first home video titles to be out in the third or fourth quarter of that year, and reported to Larry Hilford, who joined the home video division two years earlier.

In late November 1987, Orion Home Video, the home video division of Orion Pictures, had inked a deal with upstart distributor Orange Entertainment, a group headed by Leland Nolan and Eric Van Ginkle to distribute a dozen of made-for-video comedy films that were produced by the film studio, which included Dr. Dub's Mangled Movies: Volume I: Crocodile Gandhi and Father Guido Sarducci's Ninja Summer Camp.

In January 1987, Kluge faced big competition with the arrival of Sumner Redstone. His theater chain, National Amusements, purchased 6.42 percent of the company's stock. National Amusements later acquired Viacom, increasing their Orion stake at 21%, then 26%. Soon Kluge started buying more Orion stock, leading to his and Redstone's battling it out to take over the company. Kluge ultimately succeeded when Metromedia took over approximately 67% of Orion on May 20, 1988, effectively giving him control of the studio. One analyst commented on the takeover to The Wall Street Journal: "This amount is probably so small to Kluge it doesn't matter. He probably burns that up in a weekend."

In 1989, Orion suffered from a disastrous slate of films, placing themselves dead last among the larger Hollywood studios in terms of box office revenue. Among its biggest flops that year were Great Balls of Fire!, the biography of Jerry Lee Lewis starring Dennis Quaid and Winona Ryder; She-Devil, a dark comedy starring Meryl Streep and Roseanne Barr; Speed Zone, an action comedy vehicle for SCTV alumni John Candy, Joe Flaherty, and Eugene Levy; and Miloš Forman's adaptation of Les Liaisons dangereuses, Valmont, which competed with Dangerous Liaisons, also based on the same source material. Test screenings of the "Weird Al" Yankovic comedy UHF were so strong that Orion had high expectations for it. It flopped at first, but it has since attained a strong cult following. Also that year, it inked a deal with Nelson Entertainment to distribute titles on videocassette and theatrically.

In February 1990, Orion signed a deal with Columbia Pictures Entertainment in which the much larger studio would pay Orion $175 million to distribute Orion's movies and television programs overseas. Orion had previously licensed its films to individual distributors territory by territory. That same month, Mike Medavoy left Orion and became head of Tri-Star Pictures.

The box-office returns for Orion's 1990 releases were just as dismal as the previous year, with such failures as The Hot Spot and State of Grace. The only bright spot that year was Kevin Costner's western epic Dances with Wolves. It won seven Academy Awards, including Best Picture, and grossed $400 million worldwide. A few months later, Orion garnered another winner with The Silence of the Lambs, but these two films could not make up for years of losses. Only Kluge's continued infusions of cash were enough to keep the company afloat, but soon he had enough.

1991–1995: Bankruptcy
After failing to sell Orion to businessman (and former 20th Century Fox owner) Marvin Davis (Sony, which had recently purchased Columbia Pictures, was also interested), Kluge took drastic steps. First, Orion shut down production. Second, Kluge ordered the sale of several projects, such as The Addams Family (which went to Paramount, though the international rights to the film were retained by Orion), in order to accumulate much-needed cash. Finally, in the spring of 1991, Kluge's people took over the company, leading to the departure of Arthur Krim. Orion's financial problems were so severe, that at the 63rd Annual Academy Awards in March 1991, host Billy Crystal made reference to the studio's debt in his opening monologue, joking that "Reversal of Fortune [is] about a woman in a coma, Awakenings [is] about a man in a coma; and Dances with Wolves [was] released by Orion, a studio in a coma."

It was during this time that ABC stepped in to co-finance and assume production over many of Orion TV's shows it had in production, such as American Detective and Equal Justice. After Orion had to shut the television division down, this resulted in projects like The Chuck Woolery Show, which was planned to be produced by Orion, instead having to find new production companies (such as Group W Productions in the case of Woolery). Gary Nardino, former employee of Orion Television Entertainment, moved on to producing for Lorimar Television, taking some of Orion's projects with him, including Bill & Ted's Excellent Adventures on Fox, and Hearts are Wild, a co-production with Spelling Television, for CBS; talent deals Orion Television had at the time (with Thomas Carter, Robert Townsend, Paul Stajonovich, Clifton Campbell and Deborah Joy Levine) were also taken by Nardino to Lorimar. On November 25, 1991, Orion sold its Hollywood Squares format rights to King World Productions after Orion closed down its television division. On December 11, 1991, Orion filed for Chapter 11 bankruptcy protection.

In December 1991, Orion was in talks with New Line Cinema, a successful independent film company, to acquire the bankrupt studio. By the following April, Orion and New Line Cinema cancelled their plans on the issue of price. Republic Pictures and the then-new Savoy Pictures also attempted to buy Orion, but no deal materialized.

At the Academy Awards ceremony, broadcast on March 30, 1992, Crystal made another reference to Orion, this time about its demise:

The Silence of the Lambs swept all five major Academy Awards; however, a majority of key executives, as well as the talent they had deals with, had left the studio. Hollywood observers had doubts that Orion would be resurrected to its former glory.

On November 5, 1992, Orion reemerged from bankruptcy. Its reorganization plan would allow for Orion to continue producing and releasing films, but financing for the features would be provided by outside sources, with the studio purchasing the distribution rights to them after their completion.

Orion's bankruptcy also delayed the release of many films the studio had produced or acquired, among them: Love Field (1992), RoboCop 3 (1993), The Dark Half (1993), Blue Sky (1994), Car 54, Where Are You? (1994), Clifford (1994), The Favor (1994), and There Goes My Baby (1994). Orion started releasing these films after their reorganization. Blue Sky won star Jessica Lange an Academy Award for Best Actress in 1995.

1995–1997: Metromedia International Group
In November 1995, Orion, two other companies controlled by Kluge, and film and TV house MCEG Sterling (producer of the Look Who's Talking series) were merged to form the Metromedia International Group. Few of the films released during the four years after bankruptcy protection were successful either critically or commercially.

In 1996, Metromedia acquired production company Motion Picture Corporation of America, and installed its heads, Brad Krevoy and Steve Stabler, as co-presidents of Orion. Both received a six picture put picture distribution deal as a part of their contracts.

In the years ahead, Orion produced very few films, and primarily released films from other producers, including LIVE Entertainment. Orion Classics, minus its founders (who had moved to Sony Pictures Entertainment and founded Sony Pictures Classics), continued to acquire popular art-house films, such as Boxing Helena (1993), before Metromedia merged the subsidiary with Samuel Goldwyn Entertainment in 1996.

1997–1999: Acquisition by Metro-Goldwyn-Mayer
In July 1997, Metromedia shareholders approved the sale of Orion (as well as Samuel Goldwyn Entertainment and Motion Picture Corporation of America) to Metro-Goldwyn-Mayer (MGM). This led to the withdrawal of 85 employees, including Krevoy and Stabler, while 111 other employees were to be laid off within nine months, leaving 25 of them to work at MGM. Orion also brought with it a two-thousand film library, ten completed movies and five direct-to-video features for future release and the Krevoy and Stabler movie put picture distribution deal. Krevoy and Stabler retained the right to the Motion Picture Corporation of America name and their three top movies. Metromedia retained Goldwyn Entertainment's Landmark Theatre Group.  One Man's Hero (1999) was the last film released by Orion for 15 years.

MGM kept Orion intact as a corporation, mostly to avoid its video distribution agreement with Warner Home Video and began distributing Orion Pictures films under the Orion Home Video label. MGM acquired the 2/3 of pre-1996 PolyGram Filmed Entertainment library (which included the Epic film library) from Seagram in 1999 for $250 million, increasing their library holdings to 4,000. The PolyGram libraries were purchased by its Orion Pictures subsidiary so as to avoid its 1990 video distribution agreement with Warner. In March 1999, MGM bought out its distribution contract with Warner Bros. for $225 million, effectively ending the distribution problem.

2013–present: Revival

In 2013, Orion returned to television production (after its original TV unit was shut down during its bankruptcy period) with a new syndicated series, Paternity Court.

The Orion Pictures name, also as Orion Releasing, was extended in fourth quarter 2014 for smaller multi-platform video on demand and limited theatrical distribution. Its name was first seen again on September 10, 2014, in front of the trailer for The Town That Dreaded Sundown that was released in October. The label's first release was the Brazilian film Vestido pra Casar.

In September 2015, Entertainment One Films relaunched the Momentum Pictures banner with an announced deal with Orion Pictures to co-acquire and co-distribute films in the United States and Canada, and selected foreign markets, such as the United Kingdom (Momentum's country of origin). The initial films under the deal were The Wannabe, Fort Tilden and Balls Out. Other films released by Orion Pictures and Momentum Pictures include Pocket Listing and Diablo.

Starting in September 2016 with Burn Country, Orion Pictures and Samuel Goldwyn Films paired in acquiring several films.

In 2017, Orion TV added another court series, Couples Court, to its syndicated line up. The show is presided over by a husband-wife team and deals with marital issues primarily cheating.

On September 6, 2017, MGM officially revitalized the Orion Pictures brand as a standalone, US theatrical marketing and distribution arm with the hiring of John Hegeman, who joined from Blumhouse Tilt (distributor of Orion's The Town That Dreaded Sundown and The Belko Experiment) and incidentally got his start at the original Orion in the 1980s. Hegeman would serve as president of the expanded label and report to Jonathan Glickman, president of MGM's motion picture group. Under his leadership, the "new" Orion will produce, market and distribute four to six modestly budgeted films a year across genres and platforms, and both wide and limited releases for targeted audiences. Its first release, the young adult romance drama Every Day, was released on February 23, 2018.

In May 2018, it was announced that Orion Classics would be revived as a multiplatform distribution label, with 8 to 10 films being released per year.

On February 5, 2019, MGM and Annapurna Pictures expanded their US joint distribution venture Mirror, rebranding it as United Artists Releasing. Beginning in April 2019, Orion Pictures' upcoming titles would be distributed through the UAR banner and Orion's theatrical distribution staff will move to UAR. The first Orion film to do so was the remake of Child's Play, which was released on June 21, 2019.

On August 20, 2020, it was announced that Orion would be relaunched again, with its focus shifting to films made by underrepresented filmmakers (including people of color, women, the LGBT community and people with disabilities) as part of the efforts to increase inclusivity in the film industry, both in front of and behind the camera, with the hiring of Alana Mayo as the president, replacing Hegeman by October. The first film released with this new focus was Anything's Possible (previously titled What If?), a coming-of-age drama directed by Billy Porter in his directorial debut. This effort continued in 2021 when they, along with Annapurna, acquired the US distribution rights to On the Count of Three two weeks after it premiered at the 2021 Sundance Film Festival.

On May 17, 2021, online shopping company Amazon entered negotiations to acquire MGM and even made a bid for about $9 billion, with the intention to own the studio's library, including Orion's films, to grow the Amazon Prime Video catalog. The negotiations are made with Anchorage Capital Kevin Ulrich. On May 26, 2021, it was officially announced that the studio will be acquired by Amazon for $8.45 billion. The merger was finalized on March 17, 2022.

On March 4, 2023, Amazon shut down UAR's operations and folded them into MGM, resulting in MGM becoming Orion's new domestic distributor, with Warner Bros. Pictures becoming the studio's new international distributor.

Film library

Notable films
During the 1980s and early 1990s, Orion's output included Woody Allen films, Hollywood blockbusters such as the first Terminator and the RoboCop films, comedies such as Throw Momma from the Train, Dirty Rotten Scoundrels, Caddyshack, Something Wild, UHF, and the Bill & Ted films, and Best Picture Academy Award winners Amadeus, Platoon, Dances with Wolves, and The Silence of the Lambs.

Following is a list of the major Academy Awards (Picture, Director, two Screenplay and four Acting awards) for which Orion films were nominated.

Highest-grossing films

Orion's library today

Almost all of Orion's post-1982 releases, as well as most of the AIP and Filmways backlogs and all of the television output originally produced and distributed by Orion Television, now bear the MGM name. However, in most cases, the 1980s Orion logo has been retained or added, in the case of the Filmways and AIP libraries.

Most ancillary rights to Orion's back catalog from the 1978–1982 joint venture period remain with Warner Bros., including such films as 10 (1979), Caddyshack (1980), Arthur (1981), Excalibur (1981), and Prince of the City (1981). Some post-1982 films originally released by Orion — Lionheart (1987), The Unbearable Lightness of Being (1988), and Amadeus (1984) (the latter two being Saul Zaentz productions) — are currently distributed by Warner Bros. as well. HBO also owns video distribution rights to Three Amigos (1986), as they co-produced the film and owns pay-TV rights. However, MGM owns all other rights and the film's copyright. The Wanderers is owned by the film's producers; however, the copyright is held by MGM/Orion.  Orion also retains a controlling interest in The Cotton Club, although major rights are now with Lionsgate, which owns the library of presenting studio Zoetrope Corporation.

Woody Allen's films A Midsummer Night's Sex Comedy (1982) and Zelig (1983) are the only Orion films from the original joint venture period now owned by MGM. Orion releases produced by the Hemdale Film Corporation and Nelson Entertainment are included in MGM's library as well, and are incorporated into the Orion library. MGM did not acquire the Hemdale films (which include The Terminator, Hoosiers,  and Platoon) or the Nelson films (including the Bill & Ted films) until MGM bought the pre-1996 library of PolyGram Filmed Entertainment (the “Epic library”), which included both companies' libraries, although the television and digital rights to certain Nelson films are now held by Paramount Television (the result of a pre-existing deal Nelson had with Viacom), with television syndication handled on behalf of Paramount Television by Trifecta Entertainment & Media.

Many of the film and television holdings of The Samuel Goldwyn Company have now also been incorporated into the Orion library (with ownership currently held by MGM), and the copyright on some of this material is held by Orion, except The New Adventures of Flipper now carries the MGM Television Entertainment copyright.

MGM still holds distribution rights to the 1980s revival of Hollywood Squares and High Rollers the company produced, as well as the remnants of the Heatter-Quigley library that was not erased, including all remaining episodes of the original Squares; they do not own the rights to the format, which is currently owned by CBS Television Distribution, successor-in-interest to King World, who purchased the format rights in 1991 and produced another syndicated revival from 1998 to 2004.

Orion distributed the first Rambo film, First Blood (1982). That film, like the rest of the Rambo franchise, is now owned by StudioCanal as a result of purchasing the library of its co-distributor, Carolco Pictures.

References

Further reading

External links

Orion Pictures Corporation
Film distributors of the United States
Film production companies of the United States
Television production companies of the United States
Entertainment companies based in California
Companies based in Los Angeles
Joint ventures
American companies established in 1978
American companies disestablished in 1999
Entertainment companies established in 1978
Entertainment companies disestablished in 1999
Mass media companies established in 1978
Mass media companies disestablished in 1999
1978 establishments in California
1999 disestablishments in California
Companies that filed for Chapter 11 bankruptcy in 1991
Metromedia
1997 mergers and acquisitions
Re-established companies
American companies established in 2014
Entertainment companies established in 2014
Mass media companies established in 2014
2014 establishments in California
Metro-Goldwyn-Mayer subsidiaries